Punjab Thermal Power Plant is a 1,263 MW RLNG based combined cycle power plant currently under construction. It is located near Trimmu Barrage, District Jhang in the province of Punjab. This is the second RLNG based power project after 1,180 MW Bhikki Power Plant, which is being developed by the Government of Punjab through its own resources. Punjab Thermal Power Private Limited (PTPL), a company wholly owned by Government of Punjab is responsible for establishing and operating the power plant. Power plant has two RLNG based units of 410 MW each, while the third unit is a steam unit which has the capacity of 443 MW. Power plant started simple cycle commercial operations on 4 August 2022 by generating 810 MW of electricity from its two RLNG based gas turbines. Work on the steam turbine is under final stages.

See also 

 List of dams and reservoirs in Pakistan
 List of power stations in Pakistan
 Haveli Bahadur Shah Power Plant
 Bhikki Power Plant
 Balloki Power Plant

References 

Natural gas-fired power stations in Pakistan
Energy in Punjab, Pakistan